Carino's Italian is a United States-based chain of Italian food casual dining restaurants. Headquartered in Austin, Texas, the concept is owned by Fired Up, Inc., which was founded in 1997 by partners and former Brinker International executives Norman Abdallah and Creed Ford III.

The company filed for bankruptcy protection on March 31, 2014, and again declared bankruptcy in 2016. The filings were concurrent with the closing of several Carino's locations; while Carino's once owned or franchised more than 170 restaurants across the United States, as of July 23, 2018, only about 55 Carino's locations still operate.

References 

Regional restaurant chains in the United States
Italian-American culture in Texas
Companies based in Austin, Texas
Italian restaurants in the United States
1968 establishments in Texas
Restaurants established in 1968
Companies that filed for Chapter 11 bankruptcy in 2014
Companies that filed for Chapter 11 bankruptcy in 2016